The First Christian Church is a historic church at the northwest corner of 2nd and Depot Streets in Lonoke, Arkansas.  It is a two-story wood-frame structure, built on a residential scale with Tudor Revival styling.  Its first floor is clad in weatherboard, while its upper levels are clad in stucco with some half-timbering details.  It has a complex hipped roof line, its eaves lined with exposed rafters and brackets in the Craftsman style.  The church was built in 1916 for a congregation organized in 1898; it was its first permanent home. The building was listed on the National Register of Historic Places in 1997.

See also
National Register of Historic Places listings in Lonoke County, Arkansas

References

Churches in Arkansas
Churches on the National Register of Historic Places in Arkansas
Tudor Revival architecture in Arkansas
Churches completed in 1916
Buildings and structures in Lonoke, Arkansas
National Register of Historic Places in Lonoke County, Arkansas